San Domenico may refer to:

Catholic saints 
 Dominic de Guzmán (1170-1221), Spanish priest and founder of the Dominican Order
 San Domenico di Sora (951-1031), Italian abbot, patron saint of Villalago

Churches
 San Domenico, Arezzo (Basilica), Italy
 San Domenico (Basilica), Bologna, Italy
 San Domenico, Casale Monferrato, Italy
 San Domenico, Cortona, Italy
 San Domenico, Cosenza, Italy
 San Domenico, Cremona, Italy (no longer standing)
 San Domenico, Cagli, Italy
 Convent of San Domenico, Fiesole, Italy
 San Domenico, Gubbio, Italy
 San Domenico Maggiore, Naples, Italy
 San Domenico, Noto, Italy
 San Domenico, Orvieto, Italy
 San Domenico, Palermo, Italy 
 San Domenico, Penne, Italy 
 San Domenico, Perugia, Italy
 San Domenico (Pisa), Italy
 San Domenico, Pistoia, Italy
 San Domenico, Prato, Italy
 Santi Domenico e Sisto, Rome, Italy
 Basilica of San Domenico, Siena, Italy
 San Domenico Convent, Taormina in Taormina, Sicily, Italy
 San Domenico, Val di Noto, Italy
 San Domenico, Karaköy in Istanbul, Turkey

Other
 Lago di San Domenico, L'Aquila, Italy
 San Domenico School, San Anselmo, California
 San Domenico (horse), Australian racehorse

See also 
St Dominic (disambiguation)
Santo Domingo (disambiguation)